Leslie Roy Mills  (born 1 November 1934) is a retired New Zealand track and field athlete and politician. He represented New Zealand at the Olympic Games and Commonwealth Games over two decades, competing in the shot put and discus throw. He won a total of five medals at the Commonwealth Games including gold in the discus at the 1966 Games.

Mills opened his first gym in 1968, giving his name to Les Mills International, a fitness-centric company founded by his son Phillip Mills. Mills later went on to serve as the Mayor of Auckland, New Zealand's largest city, from 1990 to 1998.

Athletics career
1952: Wins New Zealand Junior shot put and discus titles
1958 British Empire and Commonwealth Games: discus, silver medal
1960 Summer Olympics: Captain and flagbearer for the New Zealand Team. Placed 11th in the shot put, and 28th in the discus.
1962 British Empire and Commonwealth Games: 5th place discus, 6th place shot put.
1964 Summer Olympics: 7th place shot put.
1966 British Empire and Commonwealth Games: gold medal discus, silver medal shot put.
1968 Summer Olympics: Competed injured, 11th place shot put.
1970 British Commonwealth Games: silver medal in the discus and a bronze in shot put.
1972 Summer Olympics: Olympic flagbearer for New Zealand. 14th place discus, 23rd shot put.
1974–1976 National Sports Director of Papua New Guinea.
1977–1979 First Director of Coaching in Athletics for New Zealand.
1978 Commonwealth Games New Zealand Coach.

Mills has trained New Zealand throwers including Beatrice Faumuina. His personal best for the shot put was a New Zealand national record for 44 years, until 16-year-old Jacko Gill broke it on 23 April 2011 with a throw of 20.01 m.

Mayor of Auckland City
Mills served as the Mayor of Auckland City between 1990 and 1998. His Mayoral term commenced with a by-election in 1990 after the resignation of Dame Catherine Tizard, who had been appointed Governor-General. The new council had been formed following local body amalgamation in 1989 which saw many of the district borough councils merged into one larger city. Mills' first term oversaw the merger of these many district boroughs into one city. The Aotea Centre was also opened at the beginning of his term. Other initiatives which commenced on Mills' watch as Mayor included the introduction of the green "wheelie bins", metered user charges for water use, council assets like golf courses were leased to private management, and the city also quit some assets that no longer were of priority, like its abattoir.

Other major events during Mills' tenure included work commencing on the America's Cup Village at the Auckland viaduct, the commencement and opening of the Sky Tower and Casino complex that now dominates the Auckland skyline, the redevelopment of the Civic theatre, and refurbishment of the Auckland Town Hall.

During this period, the 1998 Auckland power crisis occurred, which shut down most of the inner city. Mills' Britomart Transport Centre plans also came under some criticism as being too focused on property development and not enough on transport. His successor Christine Fletcher led plans for a scaled down Britomart Station without the large property development plans.

Mills was defeated in a three-way contest against businessman Richard Holden and eventual winner Christine Fletcher in 1998. Mills himself was absent for most of the election campaign, leading the New Zealand team at the 1998 Commonwealth Games, and mentoring the gold medal winning discus thrower Beatrice Faumuina.

Honours and awards
In the 1973 Queen's Birthday Honours, Mills was appointed a Member of the Order of the British Empire, for services to sport. In the 2002 Queen's Birthday and Golden Jubilee Honours, he was made a Companion of the New Zealand Order of Merit, for services to local government and sport.

In 2022, Mills and his son Phillip and daughter-in-law Jackie Mills were jointly inducted into the New Zealand Business Hall of Fame.

References

External links

|-

1934 births
Living people
New Zealand male discus throwers
New Zealand male shot putters
Olympic athletes of New Zealand
Athletes (track and field) at the 1960 Summer Olympics
Athletes (track and field) at the 1964 Summer Olympics
Athletes (track and field) at the 1968 Summer Olympics
Athletes (track and field) at the 1972 Summer Olympics
Commonwealth Games gold medallists for New Zealand
Commonwealth Games silver medallists for New Zealand
Commonwealth Games bronze medallists for New Zealand
Commonwealth Games medallists in athletics
Athletes (track and field) at the 1958 British Empire and Commonwealth Games
Athletes (track and field) at the 1962 British Empire and Commonwealth Games
Athletes (track and field) at the 1966 British Empire and Commonwealth Games
Athletes (track and field) at the 1970 British Commonwealth Games
Mayors of Auckland
Companions of the New Zealand Order of Merit
New Zealand Members of the Order of the British Empire
New Zealand sportsperson-politicians
New Zealand justices of the peace
Medallists at the 1958 British Empire and Commonwealth Games
Medallists at the 1966 British Empire and Commonwealth Games
Medallists at the 1970 British Commonwealth Games